Granville William "Mickey" Roker (September 3, 1932 – May 22, 2017) was an American jazz drummer.

Biography
Roker was born into extreme poverty in Miami to Granville (Sr.) and Willie Mae Roker. After his mother died (his father never lived with them), when he was only ten, he was taken by his grandmother to live in Philadelphia with his uncle Walter, who gave him his first drum kit and communicated his love of jazz to his nephew. He also introduced the young Roker to the jazz scene in Philadelphia, where drummer Philly Joe Jones became Roker's idol.

In the early 1950s, he began to gain recognition as a sensitive yet hard-driving big-band drummer. He was especially favored by Dizzy Gillespie, who remarked of him that "once he sets a groove, whatever it is, you can go to Paris and come back and it's right there. You never have to worry about it." Roker was soon in demand for his supportive skills in both big-band and small-group settings.

While in Philadelphia he played with Jimmy Oliver, Jimmy Heath, Jimmy Divine, King James and Sam Reed before moving to New York in 1959, where his first gigs were with Gigi Gryce, Ray Bryant, Joe Williams, Junior Mance, Nancy Wilson and the Duke Pearson big band.

In 1965 Mickey joined Art Farmer and Benny Golson's revamped group, the "New York Jazz Sextet".

In 1992, he replaced Connie Kay in the Modern Jazz Quartet.

He  recorded with Dizzy Gillespie, Sonny Rollins, Duke Pearson, Tommy Flanagan, Ella Fitzgerald, Zoot Sims, Horace Silver, Junior Mance, Sarah Vaughan, Milt Jackson, Herbie Hancock, Phil Woods, Oscar Peterson, Ray Brown, Bucky Pizzarelli, Stanley Turrentine, Toshiko Akiyoshi, Hank Jones, Bobby Hutcherson, Joe Locke, and many other jazz musicians.

Roker was still active on the Philadelphia music scene during the 21st century. He died in Philadelphia, Pennsylvania, at the age of 84, of natural causes, though he had been suffering from diabetes, lung cancer, and other health issues.

Discography

As sideman
With Nat Adderley
Little Big Horn (Riverside, 1963)
With Gene Ammons
Got My Own (Prestige, 1972)
Big Bad Jug (Prestige, 1972)
Together Again for the Last Time (Prestige, 1973 [1976]) - with Sonny Stitt
With Roy Ayers 
Daddy Bug (Atlantic, 1969)
With Joshua Breakstone
Let's Call This Monk! (Double-Time, 1997)
With Randy Brecker
Score (Solid State, 1969)
With Ray Brown
Red Hot Ray Brown Trio (Concord, 1987)
With Ray Bryant 
Con Alma (Columbia, 1960)
Dancing the Big Twist (Columbia, 1961)
With Jon Faddis
Youngblood (Pablo, 1976)
With Art Farmer
The Time and the Place: The Lost Concert (Mosaic, 1966 [2007])
The Time and the Place (Columbia, 1967)
The Art Farmer Quintet Plays the Great Jazz Hits (Columbia, 1967)
With Frank Foster
Manhattan Fever (Blue Note, 1968)
With Dizzy Gillespie

Dizzy Gillespie's Big 4 (Pablo, 1974)
Afro-Cuban Jazz Moods (Pablo, 1975) with Machito
The Dizzy Gillespie Big 7 (Pablo, 1975)
Bahiana (Pablo, 1975)
Carter, Gillespie Inc. (Pablo, 1976) with Benny Carter
Dizzy's Party (Pablo, 1976)
With Gigi Gryce
Saying Somethin'! (New Jazz, 1960)
The Hap'nin's (New Jazz, 1960)
The Rat Race Blues (New Jazz, 1960)
Doin' the Gigi (Uptown, 2011)
With Herbie Hancock
Speak Like a Child (Blue Note, 1968)
With Gene Harris
The Gene Harris Trio Plus One (Concord, 1984)
With Bobby Hutcherson
San Francisco (Blue Note, 1970)
With Milt Jackson
Born Free (Limelight, 1966)
Milt Jackson and the Hip String Quartet (Verve, 1968)
Olinga (CTI, 1974)
The Milt Jackson Big 4 (Pablo, 1975)
With Willis Jackson
Really Groovin' (Prestige, 1961)
In My Solitude (Moodsville, 1961)
With Hank Jones
Groovin' High (Muse, 1978)
With Sam Jones
Something New (Interplay, 1979)
With Irene Kral
Better Than Anything (Äva, 1963)
With Charles Kynard
The Soul Brotherhood (Prestige, 1969)
With Mike Longo
Funkia (Groove Merchant, 1973)
Talk with the Spirits (Pablo, 1976)
With Junior Mance
Junior's Blues (Riverside, 1962)
Happy Time (Jazzland, 1962)
Monk (Live) (Chiaroscuro, 2003)
With Herbie Mann
Stone Flute (Embryo, 1969 [1970])
With Blue Mitchell
Boss Horn (Blue Note, 1966)
With the Modern Jazz Quartet
MJQ & Friends: A 40th Anniversary Celebration (Atlantic, 1994)
With Lee Morgan
Standards (Blue Note, 1967)
Live at the Lighthouse (Blue Note, 1970)
Sonic Boom (Blue Note, released 1979)
With The N.Y. Hardbop Quintet
Rokermotion (TCB, 1996)
With Joe Pass
 Quadrant (Pablo, 1977)
With Duke Pearson
Wahoo! (1964)
Honeybuns (1965)
Prairie Dog (1966)
Sweet Honey Bee (Blue Note, 1966)
Introducing Duke Pearson's Big Band (Blue Note, 1967)
The Phantom (Blue Note, 1968)
Now Hear This (Blue Note, 1968)
How Insensitive (Blue Note, 1969)
It Could Only Happen with You (1970)
With Oscar Peterson and Stephane Grappelli
Skol (Pablo, 1979)
With Billie Poole
Confessin' the Blues (Riverside, 1963)
With Sonny Rollins
There Will Never Be Another You (album) (Impulse!, 1965)
Sonny Rollins on Impulse! (Impulse!, 1965)
With Shirley Scott
 Soul Duo (Impulse!, 1966) with Clark Terry
 Oasis (Muse, 1989)
Great Scott! (Muse, 1991)
Blues Everywhere (Candid, 1991)
Skylark (Candid, 1991)
With Horace Silver
All (Blue Note, 1972)
In Pursuit of the 27th Man (Blue Note, 1973)
With Buddy Terry
Awareness (Mainstream, 1971)
With Stanley Turrentine
Rough 'n' Tumble (Blue Note, 1966)
The Spoiler (Blue Note, 1966)
With McCoy Tyner
Live at Newport (Impulse!, 1963)
With Harold Vick
The Caribbean Suite (RCA Victor, 1966)
Commitment (Muse, 1967 [1974])
With Mary Lou Williams
Zoning (Mary Records, 1974 - later reissued by Smithsonian Folkways, with expansion)
Free Spirits (SteepleChase, 1975)
With Cedar Walton
The Electric Boogaloo Song (Prestige, 1969)
With Joe Williams
At Newport '63 (RCA Victor, 1963)
With Reuben Wilson
The Cisco Kid (Groove Merchant, 1973)
With Phil Woods
Rights of Swing (Candid, 1961)

References

External links 

Mickey Roker at Drummerworld

1932 births
2017 deaths
American jazz drummers
Musicians from Miami
Deaths from lung cancer in Pennsylvania
Modern Jazz Quartet members